Jangy-Turmush is a village in Osh Region of Kyrgyzstan. It is part of the Alay District. Its population was 1,208 in 2021.

References

External links
Maps, Weather, and Airports for Dzhany-Turmush, Kyrgyzstan, www.fallingrain.com

Populated places in Osh Region